The 2007 World Music Awards (19th annual World Music Awards) was held November 4, 2007 in Monaco for the first time in several years. Awards were presented based on record sales rather than any vote.  All proceeds from the evening were donated to the construction of a hospital in Darfur.  The show was hosted by Julian McMahon.  Performers included Nightwish, Akon, Amr Diab, Avril Lavigne, Cascada, Celine Dion, Ciara, Laura Pausini, Maná and Rihanna.

Legend Awards
 
Outstanding contribution to R & B: Patti LaBelle
Announcing Patti LaBelle's Legend Award for outstanding contribution to R&B music, Ciara named Patti as "the High Priestess of Good Vibrations."    Patti's benevolent attitude was best summed up with her own words. "It's not about making money, because I don’t need money, but I need to sing."
Outstanding Contribution to Music: Celine Dion
Prince Albert II, presenting Celine Dion's Legend Award, praised the Canadian artist. According to the Prince, "Her contribution to music is as potent as her courageous voice."

Entertainer of the year

Rihanna

Winners

DJ
World's Best Selling DJ: David Guetta

Internet
World's Best Selling Internet Artist: Akon

Latin
World's Best Selling Latin Group: Maná

New
Best Selling New Artist: Mika

Pop
World's Best Selling Pop Female Artist: Rihanna
World's Best Selling Pop Male Artist: Justin Timberlake

Pop Rock
World's Best Selling Pop Rock Female Artist: Avril Lavigne
World's Best Selling Pop Rock Male Artist: Mika

Rap Hip Hop
World's Best Selling Rap Hip Hop Artist: 50 Cent

R&B

World's Best Selling R&B Female Artist: CiaraWorld's Best Selling R&B Male Artist: AkonRegional Awards
Best Selling African Artist: AkonBest Selling American Artist: Justin TimberlakeBest Selling Australian Artist: SilverchairBest Selling British Artist: MikaBest Selling Canadian Artist: Avril LavigneBest Selling Chinese Artist: Jay ChouBest Selling Dutch Artist: Within TemptationBest Selling French Artist: Christophe WillemBest Selling German Artist: CascadaBest Selling Irish Group: U2Best Selling Italian Artist: Laura PausiniBest Selling Latin American Artist: ManáBest Selling Middle Eastern Artist: Amr DiabBest Selling Russian Artist: SerebroBest Selling Spanish Artist: Miguel BoséBest Selling Scandinavian Artist: Nightwish'Top Award Winners
Akon won three awards:  (1) Best Selling R&B Male Artist, (2) Best Selling African Artist and (3) Best Selling Internet Artist
Mika won three awards: (1) Best Selling British Artist, (2) Best Selling New Artist and (3) Best Selling Pop /Rock Male Artist.
Rihanna won two awards: (1) Entertainer of the Year and (2) Best Selling Pop Female Artist
Avril Lavigne won two awards: (1) Best Selling Pop Rock Female Artist and (2) Best Selling Canadian Artist.
Justin Timberlake won two awards: (1) World's Best Selling Pop Male Artist and (2) Best Selling American Artist.
Maná won two awards: (1) World's Best Selling Latin Group and (2) Best Selling Latin American Artist.

Official sponsor
This year's World Music Awards was sponsored by English fashion brand Belstaff, one of the best known companies in its field with many products appearing in Hollywood blockbuster movies including Mission: Impossible III, Ocean's Twelve and The Departed''.

References

External links
Belstaff
World Music Awards

World Music Awards, 2007
Lists of World Music Award winners